Murderous Maids is  a French film directed by Jean-Pierre Denis, released in 2000, which tells the true story of two French maids, Christine and Lea Papin. The screenplay by Jean-Pierre Denis with Michèle Pétin, was based on the book  L'affaire Papin by Paulette Houdyer. It told the story of the double murder committed by the maids, which made sensational headlines in France in 1933. The film had 360,846 admissions in France.

Plot
Christine Papin (Sylvie Testud), and Léa Papin (Julie-Marie Parmentier) are sisters with a troubled past, who work as maids in Le Mans, France. After a string of domestic jobs, they start working for the Lancelin family, which consists of Monsieur Lancelin, his wife and their adult daughter Genevieve. Christine sees in Madame Lancelin a mother figure, in spite of her severity. But their wretched background — an indifferent mother, a drunken, abusive father and time spent in orphanages — casts a shadow over the girls. Over time, their ill-fated situation darkens and they withdraw into themselves. Finally, after six years of service, they end up committing a particularly brutal crime on February 2, 1933: killing Madame Lancelin and her daughter after gouging their eyes out.

Cast 
 Sylvie Testud as Christine Papin 
 Julie-Marie Parmentier as Léa Papin 
 Isabelle Renauld as Clémence 
 François Levantal as Le Gazé 
 Dominique Labourier as Madame Lancelin 
 Jean-Gabriel Nordmann as M. Lancelin 
 Marie Donnio as Geneviève Lancelin 
 Michaël Abiteboul as Etienne
 Nadia Barentin as La mère supérieure

Awards and nominations
Sylvie Testud won the César Award for Most Promising Actress in 2001 for her performance as Christine Papin. The film was nominated for the César for best film,  and Jean-Pierre Denis for best director.

References

External links
 

2000 films
2000s French-language films
2000 crime drama films
Films directed by Jean-Pierre Denis
Maids in films
StudioCanal films
French crime drama films
Films set in 1933
2000s French films